Barranca del Muerto is the southern terminus of Line 7 of the Mexico City Metro. It is located in the  Álvaro Obregón borough. In 2019, the station had an average ridership of 45,703 passengers per day, making it the busiest station in Line 7.

Name and pictogram
The metro station is named after Avenida Barranca del Muerto, which was once a big depression, the same length as the actual avenue (barranca means gully or ravine). During the Mexican Revolution (1910–1921) this was a place where revolutionary soldiers dropped many corpses. Eagles and buzzards flew nearby, smelling rotten flesh. Popular imagination refers to the dead people's souls and ghosts restlessly promenading near that big hole. Thus, Barranca del Muerto means "Canyon of the Dead".

The station's pictogram depicts two eagles, some say buzzards.

History

This station was supposed to be a provisional terminal. According to original plans, Line 7 would be extended south and reach as far as San Jerónimo. Nevertheless, such plans never materialized and Barranca del Muerto has been Line 7 southern terminus since.

Recently, in 2017, mayors from the Álvaro Obregón and Magdalena Contreras municipalities, have asked Mexico City's government to pick up the project again and continue with the southern expansion of the line to San Jerónimo, that would benefit around 500,000 inhabitants of both municipalities.

General information
Metro Barranca del Muerto is located at the intersection of Avenida Revolución and Avenida Barranca del Muerto, on the border of the Álvaro Obregón and Benito Juárez municipalities.

The station has two separated platforms, one used for arriving trains and another one for departing trains. The exit is at the middle of the platforms. There are two exits, located at the intersection of Avenida Revolución (which leads further to San Ángel), Macedonio Alcala, and Calle Alfonso Caso.

South of Barranca del Muerto, there is a Saturday market at the famous San Jacinto square (Bazar de los sábados de San Jacinto) where artists sell paintings, plants and other handcrafts.

Metro Barranca del Muerto, like many stations in the Metro network, has a cyber center, where users can access internet through a computer; the service is free. The station also has a cultural display and the sculptural mural Visión del Mictlán by Luis Y. Aragón, which is located right outside the east access to the station.

The station serves the Guadalupe Inn and Los Alpes neighborhoods.

Ridership

Exits
West: Av. Revolución and Condor, Col. Los Alpes
East: Av. Revolución and Gustavo Campa, Col. Guadalupe Inn

Station layout

Gallery

References

Barranca del Muerto
Mexico City Metro stations in Álvaro Obregón, Mexico City
Railway stations opened in 1985
1985 establishments in Mexico
Accessible Mexico City Metro stations